The Somali Stock Exchange (SSE), also known as the Somalia Stock Exchange, is the national bourse of Somalia  founded by SEF.

Overview

The Somali Stock Exchange (SSE) was founded by the management of the Somali Economic Forum (SEF), whose principal aim is to encourage Foreign Direct Investment (FDI) into Somalia’s growing economy. The company has already made history by becoming the first ever stock exchange to operate inside of Somalia, with the first shares sold on 1st September 2015 at the exchange’s offices in Garowe, Mogadishu and Hargeisa.

Historically, shares in Somali businesses have been bought and sold informally through close networks. However, economists have noted that in recent years, the emergence of various stock exchanges in African states has played a pivotal role in fostering economic and private sector growth. The substantial demand for capital is increasing by the day for Somali businesses, consisting of both large firms and SME’s. According to the latest figures, the capital inflow to Somalia is increasing and it is being driven by both the Somali diaspora and foreigners.

The SSE has created an new capital market, where buyers of financial securities can do business with sellers in a more organised, formal, secure and profitable way. The aim was to create a sustainable capital market in Somalia, where holders of financial securities such as stocks, bonds and buyers or investors can meet and share in long-term growth.

Products and services 
Stock, Bonds (Sukuk), Commodities

See also
Central Bank of Somalia
Ministry of Natural Resources (Somalia)
Ministry of Industry and Trade (Somalia)
Ministry of Finance (Somalia)
Federal Government of Somalia

References

External links
Official Website

Organizations established in 2012
Stock exchanges in Africa
Economy of Somalia
Companies of Somalia
Economy of Mogadishu
2012 establishments in Somalia